The Battle of Fort Ridgely was an early battle in the Dakota War of 1862. Built between 1853–1855 in the southern part of what was then the territory of Minnesota, Fort Ridgely was the only military post between the Dakota Reservation and the settlers. As of August 18, 1862, the fort was garrisoned by 76 men and two officers of Company B of the 5th Minnesota Infantry Regiment, under the command of Captain John S. Marsh, who had fought in the Civil War in the First Battle of Bull Run.

Background
On August 18, 1862, the Lower Sioux Agency in Renville County, Minnesota, was attacked by Dakota men. They had come to the Agency to barter for the food that had been withheld from them and starvation had set in. There was a discussion amongst the white leaders gathered there with the head of the Lower Sioux Agency. The primary Indian Agent was against it, but the other men persuaded him to give the Dakota a small amount of porkback and flour. The Agent then added that the food would only be delivered to the reservation in the morning and only if the Dakota returned to the reservation immediately. Until that point, the well-armed Dakota men had stood by peacefully in the hot August temperatures. The greatly out-numbered 67 white men gathered there became uncomfortable with the stipulation and began to form small groups to head back to their homes.

Inevitable fighting began with some of the Dakota men pursued the settlers who left, while the rest remained to fight those holed up in the Agency building.  Within a few hours 20 white settlers had been killed and 10 captured. Some white settlers escaped, heading for Fort Ridgely, while the majority tried to race for their homes and families. The men heading for their homes made plans to assemble in the morning to try to reach the fort.

Mr. J.C. Dickinson, who seems to have been the first to escape, took his family in a wagon to Fort Ridgely, where nobody believed that there had been an attack. More settlers arrived, convincing Captain John S. Marsh, Company B, Fifth Minnesota, that the Agency had been attacked. Marsh ordered Drummer Charles M. Culver, a twelve-year-old (who would die in 1943, at 93, as Company B's last survivor) to beat the long-roll. About 74 men fell in, amongst who were Captain Marsh, Second Lieutenant Thomas P. Gere, about 4 sergeants, 7 corporals, and about 62 privates. Marsh chose 46 men, along with Dakota Interpreter Peter Quinn, to set out for the Agency. Along the way they saw many dead whites and Dakota. Quinn was one of the first of this party killed by Chief White Dog, along with about 10 of the soldiers. By late afternoon, Capt. Marsh had only eleven men left in his command, with twenty-four having been killed. Marsh decided to head back to the fort and tried to take the men across the Minnesota River. Marsh was a strong swimmer, but he was seized by a cramp. Sergeant John F. Bishop, the ranking officer, ordered Privates John Brennan, James Dunn, and Stephen Van Buren to swim for Marsh. Brennan reached him first, and Marsh grabbed Brennan's shoulder but fell off. Marsh drowned and the men saw his body float by in the river. He was about 28 when he died. (See Battle of Redwood Ferry.) Sergeant Bishop led the remaining eleven back to the fort. They arrived before midnight and the Battle of Fort Ridgely started.

Before Marsh left, he had sent word to Lt. Sheehan, who left Fort Ridgely on August 17, to return with 50 men from Company C, Fifth Minnesota. When Bishop and Sheehan met, they sent Private William J. Sturgis out to warn others, including Minnesota Governor Alexander Ramsey about the uprising. Lt. Norman K. Culver, Company B, and others began recruiting volunteers in St. Paul, and they arrived at Fort Ridgely with the "Renville Rangers" as reinforcements. There were about 50 white men under First Lieutenant James Gorman, men who were going to muster into Civil War Service, but went instead to Fort Ridgely with a Harper rifle and three rounds of ammunition each. Altogether, about 70 Minnesota citizens volunteered. About 10 of them were women and others were related to soldiers. Company B membership rose from about 65 to over 200. Some notables include Sutler B.H. Randall, Ordnance Sergeant John Jones, Dr. Alfred Muller, and Major E.A.C. Hatch, an experienced cavalry man who would one day lead Hatch's Battalion, Minnesota Volunteer Cavalry.

Battle
On August 20, 1st Lt. Timothy J. Sheehan, C Company, commanded Fort Ridgely.  Captain Marsh of B Company 5th Minnesota had been the post commander until he died at the Battle of Redwood Ferry two days before.  1st Lt. Culver, B Company, was quartermaster-commissary. Eight men were wounded or assigned hospital duty.  The Fort had numerous volunteers arrive before an estimated 400 Indians attacked. The first shots killed Private Mark. M. Greer, Co. C, and wounded Corporal William Good, Co. B. Good had a head wound and was declared dead.  Actually, he managed to live and was discharged for disability in October. Sergeant Bishop commanded the pickets. Several soldiers were wounded. Private William H. Blodgett, Company B, was wounded in the spinal column but continued to fight. By the end of the battle three soldiers were killed and another 13 wounded.

The next day it rained, so the men and women worked at preparing the fort and strengthen the defenses. Ordnance Sergeant Jones had three six-pound cannons, two twelve pounders, and one twenty-four pound gun positioned. The 24-pounder was his while Sgts. James G. McGrew and Bishop commanded the twelve pounders. For miles around the settlers had been trying to evade and escape for two days.  Bodies and burning homes dotted the landscapes. The Dakota had ransacked everything looking for food and goods. Some women and children had been kidnapped, but for the most part, the settlers were killed instead of captured. One account, a narrative of Justina Kreiger tells of a group of settlers who set off on August 18 and were almost all killed, while Mrs. Kreiger did not arrive at the Fort until September 3. It took great effort to save her life as she had sustained many life-threatening injuries and was also almost starved.

On August 22 the Dakota had a force of 800 to attack the fort. The first attack was repelled, but there were skirmishes throughout the day. Towards evening the Dakota staged a more serious attack from the north. Lt. Sheehan was forced to order the buildings on that side to be set ablaze to stop the Indians sneaking into the Fort through them. It is recorded the buildings went up in a greenish smoke.  Little Crow's men maintained their siege until August 27, when Colonel Henry H. Sibley arrived with 1,400 from Fort Snelling.

Aftermath
After Fort Ridgely small groups of Dakota continued to attack various settlements until September 23. An estimated 500 settlers, militia and military were killed in the uprising.  Governor Ramsey placed a $25/scalp bounty on the Sioux men.  President Lincoln reduced the condemned to thirty-eight. One was pardoned as it proven he was ten miles away from the deed for which he was convicted. Thirty-eight Sioux were hung December 26, 1862, in Mankato, Minnesota, the largest mass-execution in U.S. history.  Another two were drugged and  kidnapped in Canada and brought back to be hanged in 1864.  Governor Ramsey's replacement raised the bounty to $200/scalp.  The State paid $500 for Little Crow's which the State Historical Society displayed for years.

Notes

References

External links
Casualties at Ft Ridgely August 22, 1863
NPS
CWSAC Report Update and Resurvey: Individual Battlefield Profiles

Fort Ridgely
Fort Ridgely
Nicollet County, Minnesota
Fort Ridgely
Fort Ridgely
August 1862 events